Super Ready/Fragmenté is the sixth album by Industrial band The Young Gods.

Track listing
 "I’m The Drug" - 3:05
 "Freeze" - 2:36
 "C’est Quoi C’est Ça" - 4:04
 "El Magnifico" - 3:28
 "Stay With Us" - 4:31
 "About Time" - 5:20
 "Machine Arrière" - 1:03
 "The Color Code" - 5:27
 "Super Ready/Fragmenté" - 8:59
 "Secret"* - 3:42
 "Everythere" - 3:49
 "Un Point C’est Tout" - 5:18
 - original (slightly different version) on the compilation album XXY

Personnel
 Al Comet (Alain Monod) - Keyboards
 Yannick Gremaud - Assistant Engineering
 George Marino - Mastering
 Roli Mosimann - Producer, Mixing
 Benoît Saillet - Assistant Engineering
 Bertrand Siffert - Engineering
 Franz Treichler - Vocals
 Bernard Trontin - Drums

References

The Young Gods albums
2007 albums
Ipecac Recordings albums
Albums produced by Roli Mosimann